From the Waist Up is a 2010 Italian film, written and directed by Gianfrancesco Lazotti.

Plot
Rosalba (Nicoletta Romanoff) loves Danilo (Filippo Nigro), a young man who is serving a long prison sentence. To ease his detention, she decides to write him a sweet letter every day. However it is not easy to translate her feelings into words, so she turns to her best friend Katia (Cristiana Capotondi) for help, who now is on a wheelchair. Katia takes on the role of love promoter, just like Cyrano de Bergerac, but it soon becomes complicated, as little by little those emotions, those poetic lines conceived for Rosalba, become her own, and Danilo's passionate replies begin to belong to Katia. When Rosalba and Danilo break up, Katia sets out to meet him in prison, to see what the man she has fallen for actually looks like. Unfortunately, as she is not a relative, she can't obtain a permission to see him. However, her will is stronger than the rules.

Cast
 Cristiana Capotondi - Katia
 Filippo Nigro - Danilo
 Nicoletta Romanoff - Rosalba
 Pino Insegno - Superintendent Ciarnò
 Carlo Buccirosso - Prison director
 Gianni Cinelli - Assistant Vitale
 Carlo Giuseppe Gabardini - Social worker
 Arcangelo Iannace - Don Paolino
 Norma Vadori - Miriam Pontozzi
 Donatella Rimoldi - Katia's mother
 Pio Milano - Moreno

Awards
Special Grand Prix of the jury (Montreal World Film Festival): Gianfrancesco Lazotti
Best Picture (Taormina Film Fest): Gianfrancesco Lazotti
Best Actor in a Leading Role (Taormina Film Fest): Filippo Nigro
Best Actress in a Leading Role (Taormina Film Fest): Cristiana Capotondi

References

External links

Italian comedy films
2010s Italian films